The Bodø Region is a metropolitan region in Nordland county in northern Norway, centered on the town of Bodø.  Before 1 January 2005, the municipality of Skjerstad was part of the region, but it has since merged into the municipality of Bodø.  There are several "city regions" that the government has declared in Norway. The population figures are per 01.01.2014 

In addition to these areas in the "official" region, many people in neighboring Fauske commute daily to Bodø.

References

Metropolitan regions of Norway
Bodø
Gildeskål
Beiarn